Fairbanks–Hillgrade is a local service district and designated place in the Canadian province of Newfoundland and Labrador. It is on New World Island.

Geography 
Fairbanks-Hillgrade is in Newfoundland within Subdivision H of Division No. 8. It consists of the unincorporated communities of Fairbanks, Tilt Cove, and Hillgrade. These communities are along Route 340.

Demographics 

Government 
Fairbanks-Hillgrade is a local service district (LSD) that is governed by a committee responsible for the provision of certain services to the community. The chair of the LSD committee is Corey Adams.

See also 
List of communities in Newfoundland and Labrador
List of designated places in Newfoundland and Labrador
List of local service districts in Newfoundland and Labrador

References 

Populated coastal places in Canada
Designated places in Newfoundland and Labrador
Local service districts in Newfoundland and Labrador